The Supermarine S.6 is a 1920s British single-engined single-seat racing seaplane built by Supermarine. The S.6 continued the line of Supermarine seaplane racers that were designed for Schneider Trophy contests of the late 1920 and 1930s.

Design and development
Following the success of the Supermarine S.5 in the 1927 Schneider Trophy R.J. Mitchell designed a successor, the Supermarine S.6, to Specification 8/28. Refining the design of the earlier S.5, Mitchell now used all-metal construction. The new design used a new powerplant: The  Napier Lion VIIB engine was judged to be incapable of further development, and the S.6  used the specially developed 1,900 hp (1,417 kW) Rolls-Royce R engine. With the problems of cooling attendant on such a high power output, the S.6 had surface radiators built into the floats as well as the wings, and Mitchell even arranged for  airflow through the wing internal structure.

Two aircraft (serial numbers N247 and N248) were built at Woolston, delivered in August 1929, and operated by the RAF High Speed Flight.

Operational history
The two S.6 racers were entered into the 1929 Schneider Trophy at Calshot, England. N247 came first piloted by Flying Officer H.R.D. Waghorn at a speed of 328.63 mph (528.88 km/h). N248 was disqualified when it turned inside one of the marker poles, but nonetheless, set World closed-circuit records for 50 and 100 km during its run.

The British government withdrew support for the next Schneider Trophy race in 1931 but due to a public outcry as well as private financing coming forward, mostly from the patriotic Lady Lucy Houston, funding was restored, a mere nine months before the contest. All that could be done was to modify the S.6 to take a more powerful 2,350 hp (1,750 kW) version of the Rolls-Royce R engine and two were built as the Supermarine S.6B. The two existing S.6s were re-designated as S.6As with new floats, added cooling areas and statically-balanced control surfaces. All four S.6s were brought up to a similar standard with nine Rolls-Royce R engines shared between them.

Although the British team faced no competitors, the RAF High Speed Flight brought six Supermarine Schneider racers to Calshot Spit on Southampton Water for training and practice. The aircraft were: S.5 N219, second at Venice in 1927, S.5 N220, winner at Venice in 1927, S.6A N247, that won at Calshot in 1929, S.6A N248, disqualified at Calshot in 1929, alongside the new and untested S.6Bs, S1595 and S1596.

The British plan for the Schneider contest was to have S1595 fly the course alone and if its speed was not high enough, or it encountered mechanical failure, then the more proven S.6A N248 would fly the course. If both S1595 and N248 failed in their attempts, N247 held in reserve would be used. The S.6B S1596 was then to attempt the World Air Speed Record. During training N247 flown by Navy Lt. G.N. Brinton was destroyed in a fatal takeoff accident, precluding any other plans with only the two S.6Bs and the surviving S.6A prepared for the final Schneider run. N248 remained as part of the team for the 1931 contest at Calshot but did not fly in the race.

Aircraft on display

Until the 1960s, S.6A N248  was displayed incorrectly as S.6B S1596 as a visitor attraction in a building adjacent to Southampton Royal Pier. Now restored since 1983 and repainted in its original 1931 scheme, the S.6A is on display at the Solent Sky museum in Southampton, England.

Operators

 Royal Air Force
 High Speed Flight

Specifications (N247)

See also

References

Notes

Bibliography

 Andrews, C.F. and E.B. Morgan. Supermarine Aircraft since 1914, 2nd edition. London: Putnam, 1987. .
 Green, William, ed. "Supermarine's Schneider Seaplanes." Flying Review International, Volume 10, No. 11, July 1967.
 The Illustrated Encyclopedia of Aircraft (Part Work 1982–1985). London: Orbis Publishing, 1985.
 
 Winchester, Jim. "Supermarine S.6B". Concept Aircraft: Prototypes, X-Planes and Experimental Aircraft. Kent, UK: Grange Books plc., 2005. .

External links
 Newsreel footage of 1929 Schneider Trophy racing teams, British Supermarine S.6A aircraft (No. 2 and No. 8), and Italian Macchi M.67 (No. 10) and Macchi M.52R (No. 4) aircraft at the 1929 Schneider Trophy race 

Schneider Trophy
1920s British sport aircraft
Floatplanes
S.6
Low-wing aircraft
Single-engined tractor aircraft
Aircraft first flown in 1929